The pool frog (Pelophylax lessonae) is a European frog in the family Ranidae. Its specific name was chosen by the Italian herpetologist Lorenzo Camerano in 1882, in order to honour his master Michele Lessona.

Description

The pool frog is a small frog which rarely grows to more than 8 cm long, although females can grow up to 9 cm. Males are typically around 5 cm long, while females are around 6–6.5 cm long. These frogs are brown or green, with dark blotches along their backs, a pair of ridges running from each eye and a cream or yellow stripe down the middle of the frog's back. The vocal sacs on the male are cream or even white.

Distribution 
The pool frog is found across most of central Europe from the west coast of northern France to the Western part of Russia. There are also small populations of pool frogs in the United Kingdom, Spain, Sweden and Norway. Pool frogs were previously thought to be a non-native species in the UK, but studies have shown that English pool frogs are related to the Swedish and Norwegian populations.

The pool frog is found in damp areas with dense vegetation, or in calm, slow flowing rivers, ponds, bogs or marshes.

According to Amphibiaweb populations of this frog survive in urban areas and even fisheries. The creation of new ponds and other bodies of water leads to increased dispersal and a growth in the population of these frogs.

Pool frogs in Britain

Pelophylax lessonae is one of only four amphibian species recognized by the UK government as protected under its Biodiversity Action Plan. The reasons for declining populations are decreased pond habitat from human encroachment and also air pollution leading to over-nitrification of pond waters.

The pool frog has not always been recognised as a native British species. Part of the reason for this is that specimens are known to have been introduced from southern Europe (though not from Scandinavia). However research has now shown that the potentially native UK pool frogs are closely related to Scandinavian frogs, not to frogs from further south. A native origin is most likely.

The Herpetological Conservation Trust website states that "The Pool Frog is a European frog and was formerly recorded from two sites in East Anglia although it was lost from one of these in the middle of the 19th century. It was presumed extinct in the wild at the last remaining site by 1995. A single individual known from this population survived in captivity until 1999. Other populations have become established in the UK and it is known that some of these included individuals of British origin in their founding stock."

An English Nature reintroduction project is underway in Breckland, where pool frogs were introduced to a single site in 2005.

Hybridogenesis

The edible frog Pelophylax kl. esculentus is a hybridogenetic hybrid of the pool frog Pelophylax lessonae and the marsh frog P. ridibundus. Its populations are maintained however through other crossings by hybridogenesis.

References

External links
BBC News article on the reintroduction
Species page at the Herpetological Conservation Trust website
Movie with sound Youtube

Pelophylax
Amphibians of Europe
Amphibians described in 1882
Taxa named by Lorenzo Camerano